Antonio Sánchez Dietz (born 11 June 1905; date of death unknown) was a Spanish boxer who competed in the 1924 Summer Olympics. In 1924 he was eliminated in the quarter-finals of the bantamweight class after losing his fight to Oscar Andrén.

References

External links
Antonio Sánchez's profile at Sports Reference.com
Catalan Olympians

1905 births
Year of death missing
Bantamweight boxers
Olympic boxers of Spain
Boxers at the 1924 Summer Olympics
Spanish male boxers